Perfect Stranger is a 2007 American neo-noir psychological thriller film, directed by James Foley, and starring Halle Berry and Bruce Willis in their first film together since The Last Boy Scout (1991). It was produced by Revolution Studios for Columbia Pictures.

Plot
Under the pen name David Shane, reporter Rowena Price investigates a sex scandal involving a senator alongside her researcher Miles Haley. However, the story is shut down when their source becomes silent and Rowena's editor, a supporter of the senator, puts a stop to the story.

While walking home, Rowena meets her childhood friend Grace Clayton, who seeks her help in taking down wealthy advertising executive Harrison Hill. Grace gives Rowena her e-mails as proof of their extramarital affair, which Hill recently ended.

A few days later, Grace is found dead, drowned and poisoned with belladonna, leading Rowena to suspect Hill. With Miles' help, Rowena goes undercover, as a temporary worker at Harrison's advertising company, H2A. While setting up gift bags for a Victoria's Secret collection launch, she meets fellow advertiser Gina, who reveals that Hill is rich because of his wife, Mia, and if she left him, he would be penniless, causing him to be more secretive with his affairs. Rowena flirts with Hill both online and in real life, but she does not realize that the online Hill is actually Miles, who is secretly in love with her. One evening, Hill catches Rowena snooping, thinks she is a corporate spy, and fires her.

At Miles's apartment, Rowena discovers a shrine to her and explicit pictures of Miles and Grace, before she confronts him. Miles defends himself by providing evidence that Hill had access to belladonna for poisoning. Rowena goes to the police, and Hill is arrested for the murder of Grace.

After Hill's conviction, Miles visits Rowena and reveals that he knows she is the real killer and used the investigation to frame Hill. Rowena then flashes back to a memory of her father attempting to molest her, and her mother subsequently bludgeoning him to death with a fireplace poker. A younger Grace watches from her window as they bury the body; Grace has been blackmailing Rowena with this information ever since. Miles goes on to describe how Rowena had plotted the murder to end Grace's blackmail and pinned the crime on Hill. Miles asks how she intends to keep him quiet, but Rowena stabs him to death and ransacks the kitchen. She then calls the police, claiming to have been attacked by Miles and that he might have been the real murderer. As Rowena waits for the police, a man looks out of a neighboring window, having witnessed the events.

Cast

Production

Filming

Some of the scenes were filmed in the lobby of the new 7 World Trade Center, before its opening on May 23, 2006.

Release

Marketing 
The characters of Grace, Josie, and Mrs. Hill all have blogs dating back to September or October 2006 with YouTube videos of the respective actresses, in character, speaking the text of the entry with minor changes. This was a relatively new form of viral marketing similar to an alternate reality game.

Home media 
Perfect Stranger was released on August 21, 2007, on DVD and Blu-ray.

The film was reissued on Blu-ray on April 4, 2017, by Mill Creek Entertainment. It is included as a 3-pack with Straightheads (2007) and Wind Chill (2007), the latter two making their US Blu-ray debut.

Reception

Critical response
Perfect Stranger holds an approval rating of 10% on Rotten Tomatoes based on 142 reviews, with an average rating of 3.5/10. The site's critics' consensus reads: "Despite the presence of Halle Berry and Bruce Willis, Perfect Stranger is too convoluted to work, and features a twist ending that's irritating and superfluous. It's a techno-thriller without thrills." On Metacritic, the film holds an aggregated score of 31 out of 100 based on 31 critics, indicating "Generally unfavorable reviews". Audiences polled by CinemaScore gave the film an average grade of "C+" on an A+ to F scale.

Peter Travers of Rolling Stone said, "Foley fights a losing battle with Perfect Stranger, a dull, dumb and unforgivably dated thriller, free of thrills and any kind of perfection, save a genius for product placement" ... "it's a techno thriller that treats the already cliché topic of Web abuse with an idiotic sense of discovery."

References

External links 
 
 
 
 
 
 Interviews Halle Berry about the film at HipHopDX.com

2007 films
2000s mystery thriller films
2007 psychological thriller films
2000s serial killer films
American mystery thriller films
American psychological thriller films
American serial killer films
Columbia Pictures films
2000s English-language films
Films about journalists
Films directed by James Foley
Films set in New York City
Films shot in New York City
American neo-noir films
Revolution Studios films
Films scored by Antônio Pinto
2000s American films